Mi Tesoro may refer to:

Mi Tesoro, an album by Adolfo Urías, or its title song
"Mi Tesoro", a song by Guardianes Del Amor
"Mi Tesoro", a song by Jesse & Joy
"Mi Tesoro", a song by Zion & Lennox from the 2016 album Motivan2